The chancellor of the University of Illinois Chicago is the principal administrative officer of the university and a member of the faculty of each of its colleges, schools, institutes and divisions. The chancellor is appointed by the Board of Trustees following nomination by the president of the University of Illinois System. The chancellor performs those duties that are assigned by the president and that are consistent with the actions of the Board of Trustees. The chancellor is assisted by vice-chancellors for academic affairs, administrative affairs, campus affairs, and research. In September 1982, the University of Illinois System consolidated its two Chicago campuses, the University of Illinois at Chicago Circle and the University of Illinois at the Medical Center, to form the University of Illinois at Chicago. Donald N. Langenberg served as its first chancellor in 1983, and there have been 8 chancellors in total. The current chancellor is Michael D. Amiridis, who has held the position since March 2015.

List of chancellors

Timeline of chancellorships

See also
 List of chancellors of the University of Illinois Springfield
 List of chancellors of the University of Illinois Urbana-Champaign
 List of presidents of the University of Illinois system

Notes

References

 
Illinois Chicago, University of
Illinois, Chicago, University of
University of Illinois Chicago